Stomphastis tremina is a moth of the family Gracillariidae. It is known from South Africa and Namibia.

The larvae feed on Trema orientalis. They mine the leaves of their host plant. The mine has the form of a rather large, irregular, oblong, transparent blotch mine which starts as a very long, narrow gallery.

References

Stomphastis
Moths of Africa
Insects of Namibia